Cat Rambo (born November 14, 1963) is an American  science fiction and fantasy writer and editor. Rambo uses they/them pronouns. Rambo was co-editor of Fantasy Magazine from 2007 to 2011, which earned them a 2012 World Fantasy Special Award: Non-Professional nomination. They collaborated with Jeff VanderMeer on The Surgeon's Tale and Other Stories, published in 2007.

Their short stories have appeared in such places as Asimov's, Clarkesworld Magazine and Tor.com. In 2012, their story "Five Ways to Fall in Love on Planet Porcelain" was a Nebula Award finalist. Their first novel, Beasts of Tabat, was published by Wordfire Press in 2015 and is the first of a fantasy quartet.

Rambo writes predominantly fantasy and science fiction. They collaborated in a New Weird round-robin writing project for editors by Ann VanderMeer and Jeff VanderMeer, published in the 2008 anthology The New Weird ("Festival Lives", pp. 365).

A graduate of the Johns Hopkins Writing Seminars and Clarion West, they also work with Armageddon MUD, as Sanvean, and write gaming articles. Their background in technology writing includes work for Microsoft and Security Dynamics. They are a member of the Codex Writers Group and, in 2008, was appointed chair of the Copyright Committee of the Science Fiction and Fantasy Writers of America (SFWA).

In 2008, they donated their archive to the department of Rare Books and Special Collections at Northern Illinois University.

Rambo served two two-year terms as President of the Science Fiction and Fantasy Writers of America from 2015 through 2019 following one year as Vice President.

They were the co-editor with Fran Wilde of Ad Astra: the SFWA 50th Anniversary Cookbook (2015). Rambo will be the Writer Guest of Honor at Norwescon 44 in April, 2022.

Bibliography

Novels

Standalone

Tabat Quartet

Novellas

Chapbook form

Collections

Short fiction 

 "The Bumblety's Marble" (2008) in Paper Cities: An Anthology of Urban Fantasy (ed. Ekaterina Sedia)
 "Clockwork Fairies" (2011). Tor.com. ISBN 9781429927567.
 "A Man and His Parasite" (2013) in SQ Mag, Edition 8 (ed. Sophie Yorkston)

References

External links
 
 
 
 Fantasy Magazine 
 "Worm Within" (short story), Clarkesworld Magazine, September 2008
 "The Surgeon's Tale"" (short story with Jeff VanderMeer), Subterranean Magazine, Winter 2007
 "I'll Gnaw Your Bones, the Manticore Said" (short story), Clarkesworld, July 2007
 "Foam on the Water" (short story), Strange Horizons, February 2007

1963 births
Living people
21st-century American novelists
American feminists
American science fiction writers
American short story writers
Analog Science Fiction and Fact people
Asimov's Science Fiction people
MUD developers
Nebula Award winners
Non-binary writers
Novelists from Texas
People from Bryan, Texas
Science fiction editors
Weird fiction writers